Joch may refer to:

 Joch (unit of measurement), a historic unit of measurement equivalent to the yoke.
 Joch, Austrian word for saddle, often found in place names
 Joch, Pyrénées-Orientales